Gómez Farías Municipality is a municipality in Jalisco, Mexico.

Municipalities of Jalisco